The 24th Trampoline World Championships were held in Eindhoven, Netherlands from 14 September to 17 September 2005.

Results

Men

Trampoline Individual

Trampoline Team

Trampoline Synchro

Double Mini Trampoline

Double Mini Trampoline Team

Tumbling

Tumbling Team

Women

Trampoline Individual

Trampoline Team

Trampoline Synchro

Double Mini Trampoline

Double Mini Trampoline Team

Tumbling

Tumbling Team

References

 Gymmedia

Trampoline World Championships
Trampoline Gymnastics World Championships
Trampoline World Championships
2005 in Dutch sport